Moosanagar is a town in Kanpur Dehat in the Indian state of Uttar Pradesh - Pin 209208. The town is situated near the  bank of river Yamuna, on both sides of the Mughal Road. The town has a population of about 25,000. This place is also famous as Mukta Nagar. There are some very famous temples and Dargahs like Shree Mukta Devi Shree Bala Ji Dham  Pahalwan Shah Baba Dargah and Khamosh Shah Baba . People throughout the country visit these temples, being among the famous temples.
Plus, this town is a centre of trade for nearby villages. The town is known for good-quality products like metalwares, agricultural tools & machines, domestic products of routine usage (e.g. kitchenware) etc. available at appreciably low cost. Here are also available some shops of garments, textiles and jewelry which is what it is mainly famous for locally. Since decades, people of neighboring rural areas, extending as far as 20 kilometers from the town, have been coming here both for purchasing goods as consumers and doing local trade as businessmen due to which it has become a local hub of trade & business. There are two special days which are important for the trade - Thursday and Sunday, commonly known as "Bazaar ke din" (Days of market). There is a holiday for all businessmen on Monday. The town seems to have a vague imprint of Mughal Era in its culture and architecture.

Cities and towns in Kanpur Dehat district